The Estadio Humberto Micheleti is a multi-use stadium in El Progreso, Honduras. It is used mostly for football matches and is the home stadium of C.D. Honduras Progreso.

References

Humberto Micheleti
C.D. Honduras Progreso